Gaqo Paze was the first Permanent Representative of Albania (then People's Republic of Albania) to the United Nations, in New York City. He served from 1955 to 1958.

He also served as Ambassador of Albania to Mali, Guinea, and Ghana.

References

Permanent Representatives of Albania to the United Nations
Ambassadors of Albania to Ghana
1955-1964
Year of birth missing
Year of death missing
Ambassadors of Albania to Guinea
Ambassadors of Albania to Mali